Woman to Woman Tour was the second headlining concert tour by Grammy-nominated American singer Keyshia Cole in support of her fifth studio album, Woman to Woman. Visiting North America and Europe the tour had 24 total dates. Singer Chrisette Michelle was the supporting act for the North American leg.

Opening acts
 Chrisette Michele North America
 Mateo

Set list
"Shoulda Let You Go"
"I Changed My Mind"
"Zero"
"Get It Right"
"Missing Me"
"(I Just Want It) To Be Over"
"Didn't I Tell You"
Reggae Medley: "Hey Sexy" / "Wonderland" / "(When You Gonna) Give It Up to Me" / "Forever"
"Love"
"I Remember"
"I Should Have Cheated"
"I Choose You"
"Woman to Woman"
"Trust and Believe"
"Heaven Sent"
"Last Night"
"Let It Go"
"Enough of No Love"

Tour dates

References

2013 concert tours